The 1999–2000 Los Angeles Kings season was the Kings' 33rd season in the National Hockey League. It was the Kings' first season in Staples Center, which replaced The Forum as the Kings home venue. The Kings made it to the playoffs but lost in the first round to Detroit.

Offseason

Regular season

Final standings

Schedule and results

Playoffs
The Kings were swept by the Detroit Red Wings in 4 games in the 1st round.

(4) Detroit Red Wings vs. (5) Los Angeles Kings

Player statistics

Awards and records

Transactions
The Kings were involved in the following transactions during the 1999–2000 season.

Trades

Free agent signings

Free agents lost

Expansion draft

Waivers

Draft picks
Los Angeles's draft picks at the 1999 NHL Entry Draft held at the FleetCenter in Boston, Massachusetts.

See also
1999–2000 NHL season

References
 

Los
Los
Los Angeles Kings seasons
LA Kings
LA Kings